Mary Shakespeare (née Arden; c. 1537 — September 1608) was the mother of William Shakespeare.

Biography
Mary was born about 1536 in Wilmcote, the daughter of Robert Arden, a gentleman farmer and junior descendant of the Arden family, who were prominent in Warwickshire. She was the youngest of eight daughters, and when her father died in 1556 she inherited land at Snitterfield and Wilmcote from him as a dowry. The house was left to her stepmother Agnes Hill. Richard Shakespeare, the father of John Shakespeare, was a tenant farmer on land owned by her father in Snitterfield. As the daughter of Richard's landlord, she may have known John since childhood. Mary married John Shakespeare in 1557, when she was 20 years old. She bore eight children: Joan (1558), Margaret (1562–1563), William (1564–1616), Gilbert (1566–1612), Joan (1569–1646), Anne (1571–1579), Richard (1574–1613), and Edmund (1580–1607). Though Mary gave birth to many children, several of them died young. Their first daughter, Joan, born 1558 died; the name being used again for their third daughter. Their second daughter, Margaret, also died in infancy. Some members of the wider Arden family were of the Catholic faith. John died in 1601 and Mary died in September 1608.

Mary was born into a family of status and her ancestors were well connected in society, including Thomas Arden, who fought in the Second Barons' War (1264–67) on the side of Simon de Montfort; Robert Arden who fought in the Wars of the Roses, and John Arden who served on the court of Henry VII.

Mary Arden's House in Wilmcote was maintained in good condition as a working farmhouse, until it was bought by the Shakespeare Birthplace Trust in 1930 and refurnished in the Tudor period style. In 2000 it was discovered that the building preserved as Mary Arden's house had belonged to a friend and neighbour, Adam Palmer, and the house was accordingly renamed Palmer's Farm. The house that had belonged to the Arden family – which was near to Palmer's Farm – had been acquired by the Shakespeare Birthplace Trust in 1968 for preservation as part of a farmyard, without knowing its true provenance.  The house and farm are open as a historic museum displaying 16th-century life.

Notes

References

1530s births
1608 deaths
Shakespeare family
People from Stratford-upon-Avon
16th-century English women
17th-century English women
17th-century English people